Śródmieście  ("city centre", German: Innenstadt) is a district (dzielnica) of the city of Katowice in southern Poland. It has an area of 3.81 km2 and in 2007 had 35,927 inhabitants.

This is the most urbanized part of the city, home of Silesian Parliament, Silesian Museum and Silesian Library along with international companies like ING or CITI Bank. There are several consulates in the city centre.

The master plan of Central Katowice was designed by Friedrich Wilhelm Grundman in the second half of the 19th century.

Extensive city growth took place during the Industrial Revolution. The centre has the finest examples of Modernism such as International Style and Bauhaus.  Central Katowice also contain a significant number of Art Nouveau (Secesja) buildings along with the Communist Era giants such as Spodek or Superjednostka.

References

Districts of Katowice